The Most Beautiful Couple is a 2018 German drama film directed by Sven Taddicken. It was screened in the Contemporary World Cinema section at the 2018 Toronto International Film Festival.

Cast
 Maximilian Brückner as Malte
 Luise Heyer as Liv
 Florian Bartholomäi as Henning
 Jasna Fritzi Bauer as Jenny
 Inga Birkenfeld as Maren

References

External links
 

2018 films
2018 drama films
German drama films
2010s German-language films
2010s German films